Luce Baillargeon (born 24 July 1977 in Saint-Hyacinthe, Quebec) is a Canadian former judoka who competed in the 2000 Summer Olympics.

Apart from being an Olympian, Luce's highlights include:

 1997-1999 World Team member
 1997 World Championships, Paris – 5th 
 1994 Junior World Championships – Silver
 1999 Pan American Championship – 3rd
 2004 A-Tournament Leonding – 2nd
 2002  A-Tournament Minsk – 3rd
 2001 Polish Open Warsaw – 3rd
 1997 Fukuoka Tournament – 3rd
 1997 Czech Cup Prague – 3rd

References

See also
Judo in Quebec
Judo in Canada
List of Canadian judoka

1977 births
Living people
Sportspeople from Saint-Hyacinthe
Canadian female judoka
Olympic judoka of Canada
Judoka at the 2000 Summer Olympics
Commonwealth Games medallists in judo
Commonwealth Games bronze medallists for Canada
Pan American Games medalists in judo
Pan American Games bronze medalists for Canada
Judoka at the 1999 Pan American Games
Judoka at the 2002 Commonwealth Games
Medalists at the 1999 Pan American Games
20th-century Canadian women
21st-century Canadian women
Medallists at the 2002 Commonwealth Games